"Summer Rain" is the debut single by American actor and singer Matthew Morrison. The song was written by Morrison and Claude Kelly, and co-written and produced by Espionage.

Promotion
"Summer Rain" made its world premiere on February 28, 2011, on Ryan Seacrest's KIIS-FM radio show. It was made available for purchase on March 8, 2011, and Morrison made performances  and promotional rounds on The Tonight Show with Jay Leno on April 6 and The Ellen DeGeneres Show on April 11. Remixes for the song have been done by Almighty Records
.

Chart performance

Weekly charts

Year-end charts

References

2011 debut singles
2011 songs
Matthew Morrison songs
Songs written by Claude Kelly
Songs written by Espen Lind
Songs written by Amund Bjørklund
Song recordings produced by Espionage (production team)